Ashley Stansell Black is an American inventor and entrepreneur based in Houston, Texas, who is best known for inventing the fascia treatment tool FasciaBlaster.

Life and career 
Black was born in Valdosta, Georgia in 1972. She attended Auburn University from 1990 to 1994 where she studied engineering. While studying at Auburn University, she worked for William Kazmaier at his KAZ Gym.

In 1998, Black opened a sports injury rehabilitation clinic TANK (Training Athletes Neuro Kinetically) in Houston, Texas. which she later expanded to include athletes and celebrities. Black eventually sold the clinic.

In 2015, she invented and released the FasciaBlaster, a myofascial self-massage tool designed for rehab and fascia-care. According to Black, the FasciaBlaster eradicated cellulite by temporarily increasing blood flow to affected areas.

Black co-authored and published her own study of the  FasciaBlaster and its effects. The study titled The effects of fascia manipulation with fascia devices on myofascial tissue, subcutaneous fat, and cellulite in adult women was published in Cogent Medicine. After the study was published, a Facebook group claimed that the FasciaBlaster caused more harm than good. The group sent claims about the device anonymously to the FDA, pursued two class action lawsuits for warranty and advertisement, and one personal injury lawsuit. Eventually the lawsuits were dismissed by the court after the claims were evaluated.

In February 2017, Black published her book "The Cellulite Myth (It’s Not Fat, It’s Fascia!)". In 2022, she published her book "BE… From Passion and Purpose to Product and Prosperity" which she co-wrote with Korie Minkus and Lisa Vrancken.

References 

American women in business
American inventors
1972 births
Living people